Bachi Singh Rawat (1 August 1949 – 18 April 2021), was an Indian politician from the Bharatiya Janata Party (BJP). He was a member of the 14th Lok Sabha of India and a 4 time MP. He represented the Almora constituency of Uttarakhand.

He had to shift base to Nainital for the 15th Lok Sabha, as Almora was designated a reserved constituency. He however lost the Election to K. C. Singh Baba (INC).

Rawat died on 18 April 2021, aged 71 due to COVID-19.

Early life and education
Bachi Singh Rawat was born in Thapla village, near Ranikhet, Almora district.

He graduated in Law from Lucknow University and went on to get a master's degree in Economics from Agra University.

Positions held
1991 – 92 and 1993 – 95: Member, Uttar Pradesh Legislative Assembly (two terms)
1991 – 92: Member, Library Committee
Aug – Dec 1992: Deputy Minister, Revenue, Uttar Pradesh
1994 – 95: Member, Education Committee and Member, Planning Committee
1996: Elected to 11th Lok Sabha
1996 – 97: Member, Committee on Food, Civil Supplies and Public Distribution and Member, Consultative Committee, Ministry of Communications
1997 – 98: Member, House Committee
1998: Re-elected to 12th Lok Sabha (2nd term)
1998 – 99: Member, Committee on Defence and its Sub-Committee-II and Member, Committee on Absence of Members from the Sittings of the House and Member, Committee on Provision of Computers to Members of Parliament and Member, Consultative Committee, Ministry of Information and Broadcasting
1999: Re-elected to 13th Lok Sabha (3rd term)
Oct – Nov 1999: Union Minister of State, Defence
22 Nov 1999–2004: Union Minister of State, Department of Science and Technology, Ministry of Science and Technology
2004–2009: Re-elected to 14th Lok Sabha (4th term)
2007–2009: President, BJP Uttarakhand
2011–2012: Chairman, BJP Committee of Manifesto, 2012 Uttarakhand Assembly Elections

References

External links
 Official biographical sketch in Parliament of India website

1949 births
2021 deaths
Bharatiya Janata Party politicians from Uttarakhand
People from Almora
India MPs 1996–1997
India MPs 1998–1999
India MPs 1999–2004
India MPs 2004–2009
Uttar Pradesh MLAs 1991–1993
Uttar Pradesh MLAs 1993–1996
People from Haldwani
Lok Sabha members from Uttarakhand
Deaths from the COVID-19 pandemic in India